Enikali (Enaqälla)  is a village (selo) in Kurchaloyevsky District, Chechnya.

Administrative and municipal status 
Municipally, Enikali is incorporated as Enikalinskoye rural settlement. It is the administrative center of the municipality and is one of the two settlements, and the only inhabited one, included in it.

Geography 

Enikali is located on the right bank of the Gums River.

The nearest settlements to Enikali are Achereshki in the north-west, Koren-Benoy in the north, Yalkhoy-Mokhk and Belty in the north-east, Khashki-Mokhk in the east, Gezinchu and Sherdy-Mokhk in the south-east, and Guni in the south-west.

History 
In 1944, after the genocide and deportation of the Chechen and Ingush people and the Chechen-Ingush ASSR was abolished, the village of Enikali was renamed to Bezhta, and settled by people from the village of Bezhta in the neighbouring republic of Dagestan.

In 1958, after the Vaynakh people returned and the Chechen-Ingush ASSR was restored, the village regained its old Chechen name, Enikali.

Population 
 2002 Census: 1,022
 2010 Census: 1,130

According to the 2010 Census, the majority of residents of Enikali were ethnic Chechens.

The teip composition of the village includes the Enakaloy, Tsontaroy and Ersenoy.

References 

Rural localities in Kurchaloyevsky District